ECOSTRESS (Ecosystem Spaceborne Thermal Radiometer Experiment on Space Station) is an ongoing scientific experiment in which a radiometer mounted on the International Space Station (ISS) measures the temperature of plants growing in specific locations on Earth over the course of a solar year. These measurements give scientists insight into the effects of events like heat waves and droughts on crops.

ECOSTRESS radiometer 

The instrument that collects this data is a multispectral thermal infrared radiometer. It measures temperatures on the surface of the Earth, rather than surface air temperature. Dr. Simon Hook is the principal investigator of the ECOSTRESS mission and Dr. Joshua Fisher is the Science lead; both are located at NASA's Jet Propulsion Laboratory (JPL). ECOSTRESS data is archived at the Land Processes Distributed Active Archive Center (LP DAAC), which is a data center managed by the United States Geological Survey (USGS). ECOSTRESS data is discoverable through various platforms including through LP DAAC's AppEEARS (Application for Extracting and Exploring Analysis Ready Samples) tool, which allows users to quickly subset and reproject data into a geographic lat/lot format. The data collected is also published via the open-access TERN Data Discovery Portal in Australia.

The ECOSTRESS radiometer was built at JPL and consisted of 5 spectral bands in the thermal infrared (8-12 micron) and 1 band in the shortwave infrared, which is used for geolocation. ECOSTRESS was delivered to the ISS by the SpaceX Dragon after a launch out of Cape Canaveral, Florida on 29 June 2018 The Dragon arrived at the space station on 3 July 2018. The radiometer was mounted on the station's Kibo module. Other cargo included spare parts for the Canadarm2 robotic arm, as well as other equipment and supplies.

The high-resolution images have a pixel size of 70 meters by 38 meters (225 feet by 125 feet).

Key science questions
The key science questions that ECOSTRESS is addressing include:
 How is the terrestrial biosphere responding to changes in water availability?
 How do changes in diurnal vegetation water stress impact the global carbon cycle?
 Can agricultural vulnerability be reduced through advanced monitoring of agricultural water consumptive use and improved drought estimation?

Other uses 
Image data helps capture and quantify the temperature differences between man-made and natural surfaces. JPL released a report highlighting a 10 June 2022 record high air temperature in Las Vegas, NV of 43 C (109 F) and the corresponding ground temperatures. For instance, asphalt surfaces reached 50 C (122 F), while suburban neighborhood surfaces reached 42 C (108 F) and green spaces measured 37 C (99 F).

Team Members 

The original ECOSTRESS Science Team included Dr. Glynn Hulley (JPL) and scientists at the U.S. Department of Agriculture, including Dr. Andrew French and Dr. Martha Anderson. Other science team members include Drs. Eric Wood (Princeton), Rick Allen (University of Idaho), and Chris Hain (NASA Marshall Space Flight Center). ECOSTRESS is the first Earth Venture mission to establish an Early Adopters Program, which provided its members with early access to provisional data and opportunities to collaborate with other ECOSTRESS users in a Slack channel. As of August 2019, the Early Adopters Program has transitioned to the ECOSTRESS Community of Practice, with over 250 members.

Science data products 

Science data products produced by ECOSTRESS include:

See also 

 Effects of climate change on plant biodiversity
 Effects of global warming
 Hardiness (plants)
 Scientific research on the International Space Station
 Water scarcity

External links 
 JPL ECOSTRESS

References 

Biology experiments
Electromagnetic radiation meters
International Space Station experiments
Radiometry